The purple-bellied lory (Lorius hypoinochrous) is a species of parrot in the family Psittaculidae. It is endemic to Papua New Guinea. It is found in south-east New Guinea, the Bismarck Archipelago, the d'Entrecasteaux Islands, the Louisiade Archipelago, the Trobriand Islands and Woodlark Island.

Its natural habitats are subtropical or tropical moist lowland forest, subtropical or tropical mangrove forests, and subtropical or tropical moist montane forest.

Description
It is mostly red with black on top of head, green wings, and purple underparts. Its thighs are purple and its legs are dark grey. Its tail is red with dark green-blue at the tip. Its cere is white. The eyerings are grey and the irises are orange-red. The three subspecies differ with slightly different plumage colours.

Taxonomy
The species contains three subspecies:

Lorius hypoinochrous Gray, GR 1859
Lorius hypoinochrous devittatus Hartert 1898
Lorius hypoinochrous hypoinochrous Gray, GR 1859
Lorius hypoinochrous rosselianus Rothschild & Hartert 1918

References

Cited texts
 

purple-bellied lory
Birds of the Bismarck Archipelago
Birds of the Papuan Peninsula
Purple-bellied lory
Purple-bellied lory
Purple-bellied lory
purple-bellied lory
purple-bellied lory
Least concern biota of Oceania
Taxonomy articles created by Polbot